Dmitry Tursunov was the defending champion, however he chose to not participate this year. Michaël Llodra won in the final 7–5, 6–2 against Guillermo García-López.

Seeds

Draw

Finals

Top half

Bottom half

References
 Main Draw
 Qualifying Draw

Singles
Aegon International - Men's Singles